Hero of the Donetsk People's Republic is the highest honorary title of the Donetsk People's Republic, a state with limited recognition in Donetsk Oblast of Ukraine. It was established on October 3, 2014. The title is awarded by the Head of the Donetsk People's Republic and the Presidium of the Council of Ministers. The Gold Star medal is awarded to Heroes of the DPR. On the surface of the reverse side there is an inscription “Hero of the DPR”. The block of the medal is a rectangular metal plate with fabric in the colors of the flag of the DPR (black, blue and red).

Notable recipients 

 Vladimir Kononov – Minister of Defense of the DPR
 Joseph Kobzon – Russian actor
 Alexander Zakharchenko – Former Head of the DPR
 Arsen Pavlov
 Mikhail Tolstykh
 Vladimir Zhoga
 Olga Kachura
 Ramzan Kadyrov – Head of the Chechen Republic

References 

Donetsk People's Republic
Courage awards
Awards established in 2014
Honorary titles